Senator Maynard may refer to:

Andrew M. Maynard (born 1962), Connecticut State Senate
Harry L. Maynard (1861–1922), Virginia State Senate
John Maynard (New York politician) (1786–1850), New York State Senate
Mark R. Maynard (born 1972), West Virginia State Senate
William H. Maynard (1786–1832), New York State Senate